Hermine Spies (25 February 1857 – 26 February 1893) was a German concert and opera singer.

Life
Hermine Spies was considered to be one of the leading alto singers of the late 19th century, and an exceptional interpreter of the works of Johannes Brahms, whom she knew personally. Spies struck up a close friendship with the much older Brahms in the late 1870s, and he composed a number of songs for her and accompanied her on the piano in recitals, including his Fünf Lieder, Op. 105. Brahms is often thought to have been infatuated with the young singer.

Born near Löhnberg, Spies moved with her family to Wiesbaden in 1879. She took lessons with the voice teacher Julius Stockhausen at Dr Hoch's Conservatory in Frankfurt am Main and made her stage debut in 1880 in Mannheim. In 1892 she married a judge named Walter Hardtmuth. Though she was at the height of her career, she decided to retire into private life. She died aged 36 while pregnant.

A street was named after her in 1958 in Wiesbaden.

Sources
Caroline Valentin: Spieß, Hermine. In: Allgemeine Deutsche Biographie (ADB). Band 54, Duncker & Humblot, Leipzig 1908, S. 413–415.
Bernhard Hemmerle: Spies, Hermine. In: Biographisch-Bibliographisches Kirchenlexikon (BBKL). Band 26, Bautz, Nordhausen 2006, Sp. 1446–1450.
Minna Spies: Digitalisat Hermine Spies: Ein Gedenkbuch für ihre Freunde, Stuttgart 1894

References

19th-century German women opera singers
People from Limburg-Weilburg
1857 births
1893 deaths